The Honduras Foundation for Agricultural Research (Fundación Hondureña de Investigación Agrícola or FHIA), (sometimes referred to as Honduras Foundation of Agricultural Research or Honduran Agricultural Research Foundation), is a not-for-profit research facility in San Pedro Sula, Cortés, Honduras which seeks to develop new disease-resistant breeds of banana and plantain, and carries out research on cacao and other plant species.

Researchers at FHIA  developed the FHIA-01 Goldfinger banana, which is resistant to a plant disease which threatens the widely cultivated Cavendish banana.  The FHIA-03 Sweetheart banana is already cultivated in Cuba.

It continues the banana research program which the United Fruit Company originally established in 1958.

FHIA is also a participant in the Integrated Watershed Resources Management Program in Honduras financed by USAID.

Footnotes

References

External links 
 Fundacion Hondureña de Investigación Agricola 
 Honduras Foundation for Agricultural Research 
 Musapedia, page on FHIA banana program, with links to FHIA cultivar pages
 FHIA-01, a description of FHIA-01 on Musapedia
 FHIA-17, a description of FHIA-17 on Musapedia

Educational organizations based in Honduras
Bananas
Agriculture in Honduras
Agricultural research institutes